The Gown of Glory is a 1952 novel by the American writer Agnes Sligh Turnbull (1888–1982). It is set in a fictional rural village of Ladykirk, which is much like the author's birthplace of New Alexandria, Pennsylvania, about thirty miles east of Pittsburgh.

Plot
The story begins in 1881 when the Reverend David Lyall brings his new wife from the city to his rural manse expecting to stay only a year. Twenty-five years and three grown children later, David is still the spiritual leader of the Calvinist congregation. The plot explores the small joys and quiet griefs of a minister's life as well as what happens when a wealthy young man falls in love with the minister's daughter.

References

1952 American novels
Novels set in Pennsylvania
Houghton Mifflin books